Nandi, also known as Nandikeshwara or Nandideva, is the bull vahana of the Hindu god Shiva. He is also the guardian deity of Kailash, the abode of Shiva. Almost all Shiva temples display stone-images of a seated Nandi, generally facing the main shrine.

According to Saivite siddhantic tradition, he is considered as the chief guru of eight disciples of Nandinatha Sampradaya, namely, Sanaka, Sanatana, Sanandana, Sanatkumara, Tirumular, Vyagrapada, Patanjali, and Sivayoga Muni, who were sent in eight different directions, to spread the wisdom. The Cham Hindus of Vietnam believes that when they die, the Nandi will come and take their soul to the holy land of India from Vietnam.

The Sanskrit word nandi has the meaning of happy, joy, and satisfaction, the properties of divine guardian of Shiva- Nandi.

It is recently documented, that the application of the name Nandi to the bull (Sanskrit: Vṛṣabha), is in fact a development of recent syncretism of different regional beliefs within Saivism. The name Nandi was widely used instead for an anthropomorphic door-keeper of Kailasha, rather than his mount, in the oldest Saivite texts in Sanskrit, Tamil, and other Indian languages. Siddhantic texts clearly distinct Nandi from Vṛṣabha. According to them, Devi, Chandesha, Mahakala, Vṛṣabha, Nandi, Ganesha, Bhringi, and Murugan, are the eight Ganeshwaras (commanders) of Shiva.

History and legends 
 
Nandi is described as the son of the sage Shilada. Shilada underwent severe penance to have a boon– a child with immortality and blessings of Lord Shiva, and received Nandi as his son. Legends say that Nandi was born from a Yajna performed by the Shilada. Nandi grew as an ardent devotee of Lord Shiva and he performed severe penance  to become his gate-keeper, as well as his mount, on the banks of river Narmada, near Tripur Tirth Kshetra in present-day Nandikeshwar Temple, in Jabalpur, Madhya Pradesh.

Nandi got the divine-knowledge of Agamic and Tantric wisdom taught by Shiva, from goddess Parvati. He could teach that divine-knowledge to his eight disciples, who are identified as the progenitors of Nandinatha Sampradaya, namely, Sanaka, Sanatana, Sanandana, Sanatkumara, Tirumular, Vyagrapada, Patanjali, and Sivayoga Muni. These eight disciples were sent in eight different directions of the world by Nandi, to spread this knowledge.

Many other puranic tales are available about Nandi. One describes his conflict with Ravana, the antagonist of Ramayana. Nandi cursed Ravana (the demon King of Lanka), that his kingdom would be burnt by a forest-dweller monkey (Vanara), since he behaved in a restless manner, just like a monkey,while waiting to meet Shiva. Later, Hanuman burned Lanka when he went in search of Sita, who was imprisoned by Ravana in Ashok Vatika.

The ancient Tamil text Thiruvilaiyadal Puranam mentions another story in which Nandi is incarnated as a whale. It says that Parvati lost her concentration while Shiva was explaining the meaning of Vedas to her. Parvati, then incarnated as a fisher-woman to atone for her lack of concentration. To unite his master and his beloved-wife, Nandi took the form of a whale and started to trouble the people. Fisher-woman Parvati's father declared that the man who would kill the whale would marry his daughter. Later, Shiva took the form of a fisherman and killed the whale, and received Parvati in her previous form.

Gallery

Agamas describe him in a zoo-anthropomorphic form, with the head of bull and four hands, with antelope, axe, mace, and abhayamudra. In his mount form, Nandi is depicted as a seated bull in all Shiva temples, all over the world. This form has been found even in Southeast Asian countries including Cambodia.

The white color of the bull symbolizes purity and justice. Symbolically, the seated Nandi faces the sanctum in Shiva temples and represents an individual jiva (soul) and the message that the jiva should always be focused on the Parameshwara. From the yogic perspective, Nandi is the mind dedicated to Shiva, the absolute. In other words, to understand and absorb light, the experience, and the wisdom is Nandi, which is the guru within.

Nandi Flag 

Nandi flag or Vrshabha flag, a flag with the emblem of seated bull is recognized as the flag of Saivism, particularly among Tamil community all over the world. Nandi was the emblem of historical Tamil Saivite monarchs, such as Pallava dynasty and Jaffna Kingdom. Several campaigns to aware the Saivites about their Nandi flag is carried out continuously during the Shivaratri session, particularly among Tamil community of Sri Lanka, Tamil Nadu, and diaspora.

The nandi flag used nowadays was designed by Ravindra Sastri of Madurai, Tamil Nadu, according to the request and guidance of S. Danapala, a Sri Lankan Saivite personage, in the 1990s. The first Nandi flag was hoisted in 1998, at Colombo Hindu College at Ratmalana, Sri Lanka. Following years, it was declared as the official Saivite flag in fourth International Saiva Siddhanta Conference, held in Zurich in 2008. Nowadays, Tamil Saivites, especially in Sri Lanka, Canada, Australia, UK, South Africa, and Switzerland, hoist the flag in all religious and cultural festivals. Nandi flag was declared as the official Hindu flag of Sri Lanka.

See also 
 Kamadhenu
 Cattle in religion
 Gavaevodata, the primordial cow in Zoroastrianism
 Kao (bull)
 Nandi is also a village and it's a Gram panchayat of Janpad Panchayat Katangi, Balaghat (MP)

References

External links 
Nandi (Kamadhenu) Paintings
Dictionary of Hindu Lore and Legend 2004 by Anna Dallapiccola

Hindu legendary creatures
Hindu gods
Mythological bulls
Hinduism and cattle
Sacred bulls
Shaivism
Cattle deities